The Nikon D7500 is a 20.9-megapixel digital single-lens reflex camera using an APS-C sensor. It was announced by Nikon Corporation on 12 April 2017, and started shipping on 2 June 2017. It is the successor to the Nikon D7200 as Nikon's DX format midrange DSLR.

Features 
The D7500 borrows the sensor and processor from the Nikon D500, whereas other features previously available in the D7200 or D500 have been omitted (single SD card slot instead of two, and no Nikon battery grip). The D7500 is the first D7XXX series without metering support for old manual focus Nikon AI type (Non-CPU) lenses.

 Nikon DX format 20.9 megapixel CMOS sensor
 4K UHD video in 30p, 25p, and 24p
 1.5x field of view crop
 Viewfinder with 100% frame coverage and 0.94x magnification
 Nikon EXPEED5 image processor
 Monocoque design with composite carbon fiber with weather sealing against moisture and dust.
 Nikon F-mount lenses
 Active D-Lighting (three levels)
 180K pixel RGB metering system.
 Retouch menu includes filter type, hue, crop, D-lighting, Mono (Black and White, Cyanotype or Sepia)
 Multi-CAM 3500FX II autofocus module with 51 sensors in normal mode with 15 cross-type sensors. Of these points, 1 will work with any lens/teleconverter combination with a maximum aperture of 8 or larger.
 Focus points' low-light performance: -3EV 51 AF points 15 of which are cross-type
 Auto AF fine-tune achieves focus tuning in live view through the automatic setting of adjustment value with a few button operations.
 Live View Mode
 Built-in sensor cleaning (using ultrasound) helps to remove the dust from sensor
 8 frame-per-second continuous shooting for up to 50 RAW images (14-bit lossless compressed RAW)
 3.2 inch 922,000 dots tilting LCD touchscreen
 ISO 100–51,200, selectable in 1/3-, 1/2- or 1-stop increments. Additionally, ISO 50 to ISO 1,640,000 are available with ISO Boost. 
 Selectable in-camera ISO noise reduction applied in post-processing.
 Built-in flash.
 File formats include JPEG, TIFF, NEF (Nikon's raw image format compressed and lossless compressed), and JPEG+NEF (JPEG size/quality selectable)
 Single memory card slot (SD / SDHC/ SDXC)

Feature reductions 
Following features, which are available for the D7200 and D500, and which typically target professional photography, have been removed, so that the D7500 is set off against the D500's and D7200's market segment:
 No battery grip will be available from Nikon nor from 3rd parties as an accessory, due to missing connectors.  There are 3rd party workarounds depending on connecting a thin and fragile cable, where daily usage could damage the cable and its connector sockets easily.
 No dual memory card slot, which protected professionals against card failure losses
 No metering supported for older manual focus Nikkor AI (non-CPU) lenses
 No magnesium alloy used to strengthen the body internally, now substituted with "monocoque carbon fiber composite"
 No 24 Megapixels (6000x4000), now 20.7 (5568 x 3712) (also applies to the D500 having the same sensor as the D7500)

The D7500 shipped with firmware that only allowed for Wi-Fi communications to work with Nikon's proprietary SnapBridge mobile application. This also applies to the other cameras of the same generation such as the D500, D850 and D5600.

After some backlash from users, a firmware update released in May 2019 enabled Wi-Fi communications for third party applications.

References

External links 

 Nikon D7500, Nikon

D7500
D7500
Live-preview digital cameras
Cameras introduced in 2017